Marc Heider (born 18 May 1986) is an American professional soccer player who plays as a forward for VfL Osnabrück.

Career
Heider began his career at TuS Recke before being scouted in 2003 for the youth team of VfL Osnabrück. He was promoted to the senior team of Osnabrück and played sixteen games scoring two goals. In July 2006 Heider transferred to Werder Bremen where he played for the reserve team and was released on May 30, 2009. On June 26, he signed for Holstein Kiel.

Personal life
Born in Sacramento, United States, Heider is the son of a pilot. He grew up in Recke, North Rhine-Westphalia, and has German citizenship.

References

External links

1986 births
Living people
Soccer players from California
American soccer players
American people of German descent
German footballers
American emigrants to Germany
Association football forwards
2. Bundesliga players
3. Liga players
Regionalliga players
VfL Osnabrück players
SV Werder Bremen II players
Holstein Kiel players
Holstein Kiel II players